Kwerba is a Papuan language of Indonesia. Alternate names are Airmati (Armati), Koassa, Mataweja, Naibedj, Segar Tor, Tekutameso.

Kwerba is spoken in Apiaweti, Aurime, Munukania, Tatsewalem, and Wamariri villages in Sarmi Regency.

Pronouns
Kwerba nominative pronouns as given in Foley (2018):

{| class="wikitable" 
! colspan="2" | || singular || dual || plural
|-
! rowspan="2" | 1st person
! excl
| rowspan="2" | co || nano’ || nino
|-
! incl
| na’no || neno
|-
! colspan="2" | 2nd person
| am || nono || nom
|-
! colspan="2" | 3rd person
| iiniim || iinembwano || iinembwa
|}

References

Languages of western New Guinea
Kwerba languages